The Arikareean North American Stage on the geologic timescale is the North American  faunal stage according to the North American Land Mammal Ages chronology (NALMA), typically set from 30,600,000 to 20,800,000 years BP, a period of . It is usually considered to overlap the Oligocene and Miocene epochs. The Arikareean is preceded by the Whitneyan and followed by the Hemingfordian NALMA stages.

The Arikareean can be further divided into the substages of: 
late Late Arikareean: Lower boundary source, base of Geringian (approximate)
early Late Arikareean: base of Geringian (approximate). Upper boundary source: base of Hemingfordian (approximate).
late Early Arikareean: Lower boundary source of base of Geringian (approximate). Upper boundary source of base of Hemingfordian (approximate).
early Early Arikareean (shares lower boundary): Upper boundary source of base of Hemingfordian (approximate).

References

 
Miocene geochronology
Oligocene geochronology
Miocene life
Oligocene life
Miocene animals of North America
Oligocene animals of North America
Miocene Series of North America
Oligocene Series of North America